is a railway station on the Hanawa Line in the city of Hachimantai, Iwate Prefecture, Japan, operated by East Japan Railway Company (JR East).

Lines

Station layout
Matsuo-Hachimantai Station has two opposed  side platforms connected by a level crossing. The station is unattended.

Platforms

History
The station was absorbed into the JR East network upon the privatization of JNR on April 1, 1987. It was renamed Matsuo-Hachimantai Station on March 13, 1988.

Surrounding area
National Route 282

See also
 List of Railway Stations in Japan

References

External links

  

Hanawa Line
Railway stations in Japan opened in 1926
Railway stations in Iwate Prefecture
Stations of East Japan Railway Company
Hachimantai, Iwate